Sibogasyrinx pyramidalis is a species of sea snail, a marine gastropod mollusk in the family Cochlespiridae.

Description
The length of the shell attains 46 mm, its diameter 15.75 mm.

(Original description) The shell has a fusiform shape, with a strictly pyramidal spire and a rather long, slender siphonal canal. The shell is, thin, rather smooth and greyish-white. The protoconch is wanting, remaining 9 straight whorls. The straight line only interrupted by a row of short, fold-like, oblique tubercles at the lower part of the whorls, somewhat fainter near the aperture. They number 17 on the penultimate whorl.  The whorls have a second row of slightly oblong, bead-like tubercles, just below the suture, about 30 in number on the body whorl. The spiral sculpture consists of impressed striae, crossing the lower half of basal row of tubercles on each whorl, and 2 or 3 just above the suture. The whole basal part of the body whorl is spirally striated or grooved, the upper part of the whorls is nearly smooth, but for a few scarcely visible spirals and fine and coarse flexuous growth-lines, becoming much coarser on the siphonal canal, which by the intercrossing of this sculpture is slightly granular. The aperture is angular above, ending below in a rather long, narrow, slightly contorted siphonal canal. The peristome is thin, wdth a wide, shallow sinus above, strongly protracted in its median part. The columellar margin is strongly contorted, with a narrow, thin layer of enamel.

Distribution
This species occurs in the Pacific Ocean off Eastern Indonesia, Borneo and the Timor Sea.

References

External links
 
 J. Tucker, Indo-Pacific Mollusca; Academy of Natural Sciences of Philadelphia. Delaware Museum of Natural History v. 2 no. 9–10 (1968–1969)
 Kantor Yu.I., Fedosov A.E. & Puillandre N. (2018). New and unusual deep-water Conoidea revised with shell, radula and DNA characters. Ruthenica. 28(2): 47–82

pyramidalis